Ronald A. Napoli Jr. (born November 2, 1974) is an American politician who serves in the Connecticut House of Representatives representing the 73rd district in New Haven County. He is also an Alderman on the City of Waterbury Board of Aldermen.

Political career

Municipal elections
Napoli Jr. was first elected to the Waterbury Board of Aldermen in 2011 and won subsequent re-elections in 2013, 2015, and 2017. He also serves as the board's President Pro Tempore.

2018 state representative election
Napoli Jr. was elected in the general election on November 6, 2018, winning 57 percent of the vote over 43 percent of Republican candidate Steven Giacomi.

References

Napoli, Ronald
Living people
21st-century American politicians
1974 births